Claysville is an unincorporated community in Vernon Township, Washington County, in the U.S. state of Indiana.

History
Claysville was originally called Middletown, and under the latter name was laid out in 1828. When the first post office was established there in 1839, it was renamed Claysville. The post office operated until it was discontinued in 1906.

Geography

References

Unincorporated communities in Washington County, Indiana
1828 establishments in Indiana
Unincorporated communities in Indiana
Populated places established in 1828